Prilesye is a rural locality (a settlement) in Krasnoyaruzhsky District, Belgorod Oblast, Russia. The population was 128 as of 2010. There are 4 streets.

Geography 
Prilesye is located 24 km northwest of Krasnaya Yaruga (the district's administrative centre) by road. Repyakhovka is the nearest rural locality.

References 

Rural localities in Krasnoyaruzhsky District

Renamed localities of Belgorod Oblast